The 2013–14 Eredivisie season is the 54th season of the Eredivisie ice hockey league.  Six Dutch teams and one Belgian team are taking part in the season.

In the months following the 2012-2013 season, the Amsterdam G's dropped out of the league after a troubled year financially and a last-place record. The Dordrecht Lions, perennial competitors in the Dutch amateur level "First Division" (Eerste Divisie) joined the league to bring the total number of teams back to seven.

The traditional first game (known as the "Ron Berteling Bowl"), was played on 30 September between the winner of the Dutch Cup and the winner of the Dutch championship from the previous year.   The 7-team, 36-game regular season will be followed by a playoff of the top 4 teams (a best-of five semi-final and a best-of-five final).

Regular season

(*) The Noptra Eaters Geleen had two points deducted.

Playoffs

References

External links
 Results at official website

Ne
Eredivisie (ice hockey) seasons
Ere 
Ere